Lydomorphus dusaulti is a species of beetle in family Meloidae.

References
 Universal Biological Indexer

External links
 Galerie Insecte
 Meloidae

Meloidae
dusaulti
Beetles of Africa
Beetles described in 1821
Taxa named by Léon Jean Marie Dufour